Angermeyer is a German language occupational surname. Notable people with the name include:
 Heinz Angermeyer (born 1948), American-born author and artist
 Joachim Angermeyer (1923–1997), German businessman and politician from the German Free Democratic Party
 Johanna Angermeyer (1992), American academic of English literature

References 

German-language surnames
Occupational surnames